Blenheim Orange (Kempster's Pippin) is a cultivar of apple. It was found at Woodstock, Oxfordshire near Blenheim in England in about 1740. It has been described as a cooking apple.

A tailor named George Kempster planted the original kernel and the apple, known locally as Kempster's Pippin, which began to be catalogued in about 1818. It received the Banksian Silver Medal in 1820 and thereafter spread through England to Europe and America. 

This apple has a greenish-yellow to orange skin streaked with red. It has a distinctive nutty flavour and is excellent for cooking. Blenheim Orange does not hold its shape, rather, it produces a fine puree as it cooks.  Sugar 12%, acid 11g/litre, vitamin C 12mg/100g. 

Typical of triploid apple varieties, Blenheim Orange is a very vigorous tree, and on standard rootstock can grow in excess of 30 feet tall. It is slow to come into production, but will then produce heavily. Fruit needs to be thinned heavily to control its biennial habit.

References

External links
 Goldreinette von Blenheim 

1740 introductions
History of Oxfordshire
British apples
Apple cultivars
Cooking apples